Dalnic  is a commune in Covasna County, Transylvania, Romania. Composed of a single village, Dalnic, it became an independent commune when it split from Moacșa in 2004.

It formed part of the Székely Land region of the historical Transylvania province. Until 1918, the village belonged to the Háromszék County of the Kingdom of Hungary. After the Treaty of Trianon of 1920, it became part of Romania.

György Dózsa (1470–1514) a Székely man-at-arms set out from here in 1514 on the crusade announced by cardinal Tamás Bakócz which ended up in a peasant war.

Demographics
The commune has an absolute Székely Hungarian majority. According to the 2011 Census it has a population of 951 of which 98.42% or 936 are Hungarian.

References

Communes in Covasna County
Localities in Transylvania